Eddie Lee Dixon (May 15, 1916 – July 8, 1993), nicknamed "Bullet", was an American Negro league pitcher from 1938 to 1940.

A native of Bonifay, Florida, Dixon attended Morris Brown College. He made his Negro leagues debut in 1938 with the Atlanta Black Crackers, and remained with the team the following season when it moved to Indianapolis. Dixon finished his career in 1940 with a short stint with the Baltimore Elite Giants. He died in Fort Lauderdale, Florida in 1993 at age 77.

References

External links
 and Seamheads

1916 births
1993 deaths
Atlanta Black Crackers players
Baltimore Elite Giants players
Baseball pitchers
Baseball players from Florida
People from Bonifay, Florida
20th-century African-American sportspeople